VeriFlux is a formal methods based static analysis tool for programs written in Java.  It is optimized for use with JamaicaVM, but can be used for any Java program.  It can detect uncaught runtime exceptions, including RTSJ exceptions, and possible deadlocks in code using Java synchronization features.  It has also been used for resource analysis.  It can be used for both full program analysis and partial program analysis.

See also 
Aicas
JamaicaVM
Formal Methods
Data Flow Analysis
Real time Java
Embedded Java

References

External links 

Static program analysis tools